Spilarctia mindanao is a moth in the family Erebidae. It was described by Vladimir Viktorovitch Dubatolov and Yasunori Kishida in 2010. It is found on Mindanao in the Philippines.

References

 
  & , 2010: Praephragmatobia gen. nov., a new subgenus of the Spilarctia strigatula group, with a preliminary review of species (Lepidoptera: Arctiidae). Tinea 21 (2): 98-111. Full article: 

M
Endemic fauna of the Philippines
Moths of the Philippines
Fauna of Mindanao
Moths described in 2010